Johanna Gastdorf (born 1959) is a German actress. She has appeared in more than 100 films and television shows since 1993.

Filmography

References

External links

1959 births
Living people
German film actresses
Actresses from Hamburg